Acosmeryx miskini is a moth of the family Sphingidae. It was described by Richard Paget Murray in 1873.

Distribution 
Species is known from New Guinea to north-eastern Australia.

Description 
The wingspan is about 80 mm. Adults have blotchy brown forewings and rusty-red hindwings, and dark marks each side of the abdomen.

References

Acosmeryx
Moths described in 1873
Moths of New Guinea
Moths of Australia